Ardscoil Rís is a voluntary, all-boys, Roman Catholic secondary school in Limerick, Ireland. Located on the North Circular Road, its catchment area includes neighbourhoods on the northside of Limerick such as Caherdavin, Mayorstone and Clareview though many students commute from other areas of the city as well as surrounding rural areas.

History
Ardscoil Rís was formally opened by the Christian Brothers, in Limerick on the North Circular Road on 1 September 1963, when it welcomed 52 pupils. Classes were held in an old school house until the first purpose-built classrooms were available. This first intake included Pat Cox, then a noted master debater, later a distinguished politician. 

From its foundation the school was managed by the Christian Brothers. In 1989, a Board of Management, representing trustees, staff and parents, was put in place and a lay Principal was appointed. From small beginnings, the school, augmented by periodic extensions, grew to its present size and now has over 700 students and fifty teachers. The late twentieth century witnessed the contraction of religious orders in Ireland. Ardscoil Rís's last remaining Christian Brothers had retired from teaching duties by the mid-2000's and the school is now staffed entirely by lay teachers. The Christian Brothers maintain ownership and Trusteeship of the school and are represented on the Board of Management by four lay representatives.

In 2010 the redevelopment of the school went to the construction stage following almost a decade of lobbying and planning. Acting as main contractor for the project, Cordil Construction were responsible for the management of the €5 million plan, which sees the school expand to three times the usable space on completion of all three phases. Construction was temporarily abandoned in 2011 due to the liquidation of Cordil Construction, but continued following a seventeen-month delay. The new school was official opened in March 2014 by Limerick City TD and then Minister for Finance, Michael Noonan.

Profile
The School encourage all students to become involved in a variety of activities outside of the curriculum. Life skills are reinforced by participation in such activities as Music, Sports, Work Experience Programmes, Enterprise, Foreign Exchange, Drama, Concerts, Charitable Fund-raising and Gaisce. The School won the RTÉ Television secondary schools quiz programme Blackboard Jungle in 1993.

Sport
Rugby, hurling and basketball are the main sporting activities of the school. The Munster Schools Senior Cup and Junior Cup competitions (rugby), the Dr. Harty Cup (Munster 'A' Colleges Hurling) (Winners (5): 2010, 2011, 2014, 2016, 2018), The Dean Ryan Cup (Munster 'A' Colleges Under-16 hurling) (2008 Winners) and The White Cup (Munster 'A' Colleges Under 15 Hurling)(2011 and 2012 Winners) the Limerick Colleges competitions (GAA) and the South West of Ireland League (basketball) are highlights of the sporting calendar. Under the stewardship of hurling encyclopaedia Niall Crowe Ardscoil Rís have become the most successful Limerick hurling school of recent times. On 11 March 2010 Ard Scoil Ris became the first Limerick team since 1993 to win the Harty Cup (Munster schools hurling championship). They defeated the 2009 champions Thurles CBS after a third replay and lost to St. Kieran's College in the All Ireland Final later that year. On the 8th November 2014 Paul O'Connell captained Ireland against South Africa in the Aviva Stadium, Seán Cronin started at hooker and Dave Kilcoyne came on as a replacement in the 73rd minute, this was the first and only time that three past pupils of the school earned Ireland caps on the same day.

Alumni

Politics
 Pat Cox (President of the European Parliament 2002–2004)
 Peter Power former (Minister of State (Ireland))(Fianna Fáil TD)
 Brian Leddin (Green Party (Ireland) TD)
 Cathal Crowe (Fianna Fáil TD)

Sports
GAA.

Limerick
David Breen
Shane Dowling Limerick hurler from 2012 to present and 2018 All-Ireland hurling winner. 
Kevin Downes
 John Galvin (Limerick footballer from 1998 to 2014).
 Declan Hannon Limerick hurler from 2011 to present and 2018 All-Ireland hurling winner as captain.
 Cian Lynch, Limerick hurler from 2015 to present and 2018 All-Ireland hurling winner. 
Ollie Moran Limerick GAA Limerick hurler from 1997 to 2009. All Star award 2007, 5 railway cup medals with Munster, Shinty/Hurling International with Ireland. Captained Limerick Senior Hurling team in 2005.
 Donncha Sheehan Limerick hurler from 2003 to 2009 and All-Ireland Under 21 Hurling Championship winning captain in 2000

Clare
Darach Honan Clare GAA Clare hurler 2010 to present. Munster and All Ireland U21 Hurling medal winner 2009. All Ireland Senior Hurling medal winner 2013. Named U21 Hurling Player of the Year in 2009.
Conor Ryan Clare GAA Clare hurler. Munster and All Ireland U21 Hurling medal winner 2012. All Ireland Senior Hurling medal winner 2013. Man of the Match award for his performance in the 2013 All Ireland Hurling Final. GAA/GPA All Star award 2013.

Rugby.
 Paul O'Connell Munster Rugby, Ireland international, and British and Irish Lions rugby captain).
 Dave Kilcoyne Munster Rugby & Ireland international
 Seán Cronin Leinster Rugby & Ireland international.
 Mike Sherry Munster Rugby & Ireland international.
 Craig Casey Munster Rugby & Ireland international.
 Keith Matthews Connacht Rugby & Ireland Wolfhounds.
 Stephen Fitzgerald former Munster Rugby & Ireland Under-20s & current Connacht Rugby player.
 Conor Fitzgerald Connacht Rugby & Ireland Under-20s player.
 Mossy Lawler Former Munster Rugby player & current Connacht Rugby Academy Coach.
.
 Derek Daly European Power Lifting Champion

Rowing
 Sam Lynch, (Member of the Irish rowing team at the 1996 and 2004 Olympics and gold medallist at the World Rowing Championships in Lucerne, 2001 and Seville, 2002)

Music
 Blindboy Boatclub and Mr. Chrome, founders of The Rubberbandits, a comedy hip-hop group.
 Keith Lawler and Stephen Ryan of Giveamanakick

References

External links
 Ardscoil Ris site – ardscoil.com

Boys' schools in the Republic of Ireland
Congregation of Christian Brothers secondary schools in the Republic of Ireland
Secondary schools in County Limerick
Education in Limerick (city)
Buildings and structures in Limerick (city)
Irish-language schools and college
1963 establishments in Ireland
Educational institutions established in 1963